Millard Airport  was a public use airport located one nautical mile (2 km) southwest of the central business district of Annville, in Lebanon County, Pennsylvania, United States. It later became a private use airport .

Facilities and aircraft 
Millard Airport covered an area of 80 acres (32 ha) at an elevation of 485 feet (148 m) above mean sea level. It had one runway designated 11/29 with an asphalt surface measuring 2,870 by 50 feet (875 x 15 m).

For the 12-month period ending May 25, 2006, the airport had 8,500 general aviation aircraft operations, an average of 23 per day. At that time there were six single-engine aircraft based at this airport.

See also 

References

External links 

 Millard Airport - Economic Impact from Pennsylvania DOT
 Aerial image as of April 1999 from USGS The National Map
 Aeronautical chart at SkyVector

Airports in Lebanon County, Pennsylvania